Sirpa Ahlroos-Kouko (born 5 November 1975) is a Finnish former racing cyclist. She won the Finnish national road race title in 2000.

References

External links

1975 births
Living people
Finnish female cyclists
Place of birth missing (living people)